Fosfluconazole is a water-soluble phosphate prodrug of fluconazole — a triazole antifungal drug used in the treatment and prevention of superficial and systemic fungal infections.

The phosphate ester bond is hydrolyzed by the action of a phosphatase — an enzyme that removes a phosphate group from its substrate by hydrolyzing phosphoric acid monoesters into a phosphate ion and a molecule with a free hydroxyl group (dephosphorylation).

References 

Fluoroarenes
Lanosterol 14α-demethylase inhibitors
Phosphate esters
Prodrugs
Triazole antifungals